Karen Susman defeated Věra Suková in the final, 6–4, 6–4 to win the ladies' singles tennis title at the 1962 Wimbledon Championships. Angela Mortimer was the defending champion, but lost in the fourth round to Suková. Top seed Margaret Smith had a bye into the second round, where she lost her first match to Billie-Jean Moffit. It was the first time in Grand Slam history that the women's top seed had lost her opening match, albeit in the second round.

Seeds

  Margaret Smith (second round)
  Darlene Hard (quarterfinals)
  Maria Bueno (semifinals)
  Renée Schuurman (quarterfinals)
  Ann Haydon (semifinals)
  Angela Mortimer (fourth round)
  Lesley Turner (quarterfinals)
  Karen Susman (champion)

Draw

Finals

Top half

Section 1

Section 2

Section 3

Section 4

Bottom half

Section 5

Section 6

Section 7

Section 8

References

External links

Women's Singles
Wimbledon Championship by year – Women's singles
Wimbledon Championships
Wimbledon Championships